Jonathan D. Tisdall (born August 26, 1958 in Buffalo, New York) is a grandmaster of chess (title awarded 1993) and works as a freelance journalist. An American citizen by origin, he became Irish and later Norwegian. He was born to a Japanese mother and an Irish father.

He was Norwegian Chess Champion in 1987, 1991 and 1995. Combining chess with his job as a journalist, he often attends major chess events as a reporter for Reuters.

He is one of two people on the staff of the English-language section of the Norwegian newspaper Aftenposten'''s internet edition. He has also written articles in magazines such as The Spectator, The Economist and Scanorama.

In recent years, he has been studying the Japanese chess variant of shogi.

 Books 
 Tisdall, Jonathan (1997). Improve Your Chess Now. Everyman Chess. 224 pp. .
 

External links
 
 
 
 
 Capsule biography of Jonathan Tisdall – Aftenposten''

1958 births
Living people
American chess players
American chess writers
American male journalists
American non-fiction writers
American people of Irish descent
American writers of Japanese descent
American journalists of Asian descent
Irish chess players
Irish people of Japanese descent
Norwegian chess players
Norwegian chess writers
Norwegian writers
Norwegian people of Irish descent
Norwegian people of Japanese descent
Chess grandmasters
Writers from Buffalo, New York
Journalists from New York (state)